Konar is a surname. It may refer to:

 Adam Konar (born 1993), Canadian football linebacker
 Benoy Krishna Konar (1930–2014), Indian politician
 Hare Krishna Konar (1915–1974), Indian politician
 Karmegha Konar (1889–1957), Tamil poet and educator
 Kevin Konar (born 1958), Canadian football linebacker
 Megan Konar, American scientist and water resources engineer
 Nilay Konar (born 1980), Turkish volleyball player

See also
 Konar (disambiguation)